Kervin Alexander Castro (born February 7, 1999) is a Venezuelan professional baseball pitcher in the Detroit Tigers organization. He signed with the San Francisco Giants as an international free agent in 2015, and made his MLB debut with them in 2021.

Baseball career
Castro was born in Maracay, Venezuela. At 15 years of age, he hit 88 mph in his second bullpen session.

Minor leagues
Castro signed with the San Francisco Giants as an international free agent for $100,000 in 2015, when he was 16 years old. Originally a catcher, he converted to pitcher. In 2016, he pitched for the Rookie-level DSL Giants in the Dominican Summer League (DSL; Southern Division), and was 3–1 with a 4.71 ERA in 14 relief appearances covering 21 innings.  He underwent Tommy John surgery in 2017. That led to him missing all of the 2017 season and nearly all of the 2018 season, only pitching one inning in 2018 in the DSL. 

In 2019 he was both a mid-season and post-season Northwest League All Star for the Class A Short Season Salem-Keizer Volcanoes, for whom he was 5–3 with a 2.66 ERA and 0.96 WHIP (leading the league) in 14 starts (2nd) covering 67.2 innings (2nd).  The Giants added him to their 40-man roster after the 2020 season. 

He split 2021 between the Triple-A West Sacramento River Cats and the major league Giants. With the River Cats, Castro was 6–1 with one save and a 2.86 ERA in 30 relief appearances covering 44 innings, in which he gave up 6.3 hits and struck out 12.3 batters per 9 innings.  He throws a fastball that reaches 97 mph, a sharp power curveball, and a changeup.

Major leagues

San Francisco Giants
On September 6, 2021, Castro was called up by the Giants to the Major Leagues. A day later, he made his MLB debut against the Colorado Rockies at 22 years of age. Castro pitched two scoreless innings, allowing two hits and striking out one batter.

In the 2021 regular season, he was 1–1 with an 0.00 ERA. In 10 games he pitched 13.1 relief innings, in which he had 13 strikeouts. In the post-season, in the 2021 NLDS he pitched an additional 1.1 innings of shutout ball in two games, for a combined total of 14.2 innings of 0.00 ERA baseball on the season.

On August 1, 2022, the Giants designated Castro for assignment.

Chicago Cubs
On August 2, 2022, he was claimed off waivers by the Chicago Cubs and was optioned to Triple-A Iowa. On September 6, Castro was designated for assignment. He elected free agency on November 10, 2022.

Detroit Tigers
On December 25, 2022, Castro signed a minor league deal with the Detroit Tigers.

See also
List of baseball players who underwent Tommy John surgery

References

External links

1999 births
Living people
Sportspeople from Maracay
Venezuelan expatriate baseball players in the United States
Major League Baseball players from Venezuela
Major League Baseball pitchers
San Francisco Giants players
Chicago Cubs players
Dominican Summer League Giants players
Salem-Keizer Volcanoes players
Sacramento River Cats players
Venezuelan expatriate baseball players in the Dominican Republic